Joseph Graybill (April 17, 1887 – August 3, 1913)  was an American silent film actor. He appeared in several films directed by D.W. Griffith.

Graybill joined the Biograph Company around 1909 in New York City. By 1910 Griffith was the main director. Graybill worked with Biograph in 1911 in California.

Life 
Joseph Graybill was born Harold Graybill in Kansas City, Missouri on April 14, 1887 to Clarence Frank and Henrietta ("Hattie") E. Graybill. For many years his mother, Henrietta E. Graybill, worked as a Christian Science practitioner. He had a sister named Gladys. From 1894 to 1900 the family lived in Atchison, Kansas. The 1900 U.S. Federal Census shows Graybill, age 14, living in Atchison City, Kansas with his mother and sister. His occupation is listed as "at school". From 1901 to at least 1905 Graybill lived in Milwaukee.

Sometime between 1892 and 1903 Harold's father died. City directories for Kansas City show Frank C. Graybill in 1889 and 1891. A 1903 Milwaukee city directory lists Henrietta as the widow of a man named Frank. The 1905 Wisconsin census shows Harold Graybill living in Milwaukee with his mother and sister Gladys. Harold is listed with the occupation of actor.

Career
Very little is known about Graybill's film and stage career. It is unclear when Graybill left Milwaukee. His first appearance was in a film released in 1909 titled The Light That Came  directed by D.W. Griffith.

A few newspaper accounts mention Graybill stage and film acting. In October 1910 Graybill performed in a play titled Miss Patsy (by Sewell Collins) at the (now demolished) Belasco Theatre in Washington, D.C. His character was named Dr. Philip Gentry. In May 1908 Graybill appeared in a performance of "The Witching Hour" by Augustus Thomas at a Cedar Rapids, Iowa theater. In October 1909 he appeared in a performance of "Vasta Herne" by Edward Peple in Des Moines, Iowa. A newspaper review noted that the play opened the three weeks prior in Milwaukee.

A Wisconsin newspaper noted in July 1916 that a film titled "Saved From Himself" was reissued. The paper stated that Mabel Normand appeared opposite "the late Joseph Graybill. Mr. Graybill, it will be remembered, was a young actor of unusual promise who died three years ago."

Two photos of Graybill can be found in the book When the Movies Were Young by Linda Arvidson Griffith (1969). The photos depict scenes in "How She Triumphed" and "The Italian Barber".

Death

Graybill died in New York City on August 3, 1913, according to his death certificate. Different records state conflicting information as to the cause of death. The Internet Movie Database (IMDB) lists it as acute spinal meningitis. The first death notice in the New York Times contradicts the death certificate as to the day of death - it lists the cause of death on August 2 as a nervous breakdown. An obituary on August 4 lists the cause as gastritis. Graybill's death certificate and the first death notice both note he entered Bellevue Hospital July 24. The death certificate states that the cause of death was acute pachymeningitis and a contributory factor was alcohol poisoning.

Filmography
 The Wizard of the Jungle (1913) (as Joe Graybill) .... Captain Hanscombe
 Saving Mabel's Dad (1913)
 The God Within (1912) .... In Bar
 The Star of Bethlehem (1912) .... Roman messenger
 Brutality (1912) .... The Victim of Anger
 The Informer (1912) .... Union Soldier
 Gold and Glitter (1912) .... Lumberman
 The Painted Lady (1912) .... The Stranger
 The Ring of a Spanish Grandee (1912) .... The Suitor
 Rejuvenation (1912) .... The Lighthouse Keeper's Friend
 A Love of Long Ago (1912) .... Pedro, the Spy
 The Girl of the Grove (1912) .... The Wooer
 For Sale—A Life (1912) .... The Ill Husband
 The Root of Evil (1912)
 Flying to Fortune (1912) .... The Invalid Father
 The Arab's Bride (1912) .... The Buyer of the Moor's Daughter
 The Silent Witness (1912) .... The Blackmailer
 On Probation (1912) .... The Younger Brother
 A Blot on the 'Scutcheon (1912) .... A Nobleman
 The Voice of the Child (1911) .... The False Friend
 Saved from Himself (1911) .... The Young Clerk
 The Failure (1911) .... At Fiancée's House
 Through Darkened Vales (1911) .... Howard
 The Battle (1911) .... A Union Officer
 Love in the Hills (1911) .... The City Suitor
 The Long Road (1911) .... In Bar
 The Adventures of Billy (1911) .... Second Tramp
 Italian Blood (1911)
 The Making of a Man (1911) .... Actor/Backstage
 The Baron (1911) .... The Baron's Friend
 The Diving Girl (1911) .... A Bather
 Out from the Shadow (1911)
 The Last Drop of Water (1911) .... John
 A Country Cupid (1911) .... The Half-Wit
 Bobby, the Coward (1911) .... First Thug
 The Primal Call (1911) .... The Millionaire
 Enoch Arden: Part II (1911) .... Dead Shipmate
 Enoch Arden: Part I (1911) .... A Shipwrecked Sailor
 A Romany Tragedy (1911)
 The White Rose of the Wilds (1911) .... Second Outlaw
 The Crooked Road (1911) .... An Evil Companion
 The New Dress (1911) .... At Wedding/At Market/At Cafe
 How She Triumphed (1911) .... The Sweetheart
 Madame Rex (1911)
 Priscilla and the Umbrella (1911) (as Joe Graybill) .... Paul
 Priscilla's April Fool Joke (1911) .... Harry
 The Lonedale Operator (1911) (uncredited) .... A Tramp
 Teaching Dad to Like Her (1911) .... Harry
 Was He a Coward? (1911) .... Hilton's Friend
 Conscience (1911) .... The Hunter
 A Decree of Destiny (1911) .... Kenneth Marsden
 The Heart of a Savage (1911)
 Fisher Folks (1911) .... At Fair
 His Trust (1911) .... Union soldier
 Help Wanted (1911) .... Jack
 The Italian Barber (1911) .... Tony
 Winning Back His Love (1910) .... At Stage Door
 White Roses (1910) .... At Party
 The Lesson (1910) .... James, Reverend Hollister's Son
 His Sister-In-Law (1910)
 Happy Jack, a Hero (1910)
 Turning the Tables (1910) .... Mr. Peck
 Effecting a Cure (1910) .... On Street
 The Fugitive (1910)
 The Broken Doll (1910) .... Victim of Massacre
 In Life's Cycle (1910) .... In Bar
 An Old Story with a New Ending (1910) .... Jay Downs
 When We Were in Our Teens (1910) .... Howard
 The House with Closed Shutters (1910) .... Her suitor
 An Arcadian Maid (1910) .... In Gambling Hall
 The Call to Arms (1910) .... The Lord's Cousin
 As the Bells Rang Out! (1910) .... Wedding Guest
 A Flash of Light (1910) .... Horace Dooley
 What the Daisy Said (1910) (uncredited) .... The Gypsy
 A Midnight Cupid (1910) .... At Party
 Muggsy's First Sweetheart (1910) .... One of Muggsy's Friends
 A Child's Impulse (1910) .... The Other Man
 The Marked Time-Table (1910) .... Tom Powers
 The Face at the Window (1910) .... Ralph Bradford's Son
 A Victim of Jealousy (1910) .... At Reception/In Office
 The Purgation (1910) .... One of the Misguided Youths
 The Light That Came (1909)

Stage
 Miss Patsy by Sewell Collins
 Vasta Herne by Edward Peple
 The Witching Hour by Augustus Thomas

Further reading

Griffith, Linda Arvidson. When the Movies Were Young. New York: Dover Publications, 1969. This book was first published in 1925. In the introduction to the 1969 version Edward Wagenknecht writes that the book "...was one of the earliest volumes containing eye witness testimony to the conditions under which early motion pictures were made." Linda Arvidson was married to director D.W. Griffith in 1906 and later divorced.
Ragan, David. Who's Who in Hollywood, 1900-1976. New Rochelle, NY: Arlington House Publishers, 1976.
Truitt, Evelyn Mack. Who Was Who on Screen, 2nd ed. New York: R.R. Bowker, 1977.
Truitt, Evelyn Mack. Who Was Who on Screen, 3rd ed. New York: R.R. Bowker, 1983.

External links

References

1887 births
1913 deaths
American male film actors
Male actors from Milwaukee
American male silent film actors
Neurological disease deaths in New York (state)
Infectious disease deaths in New York (state)
Deaths from meningitis
20th-century American male actors